Conete is a village in the Tiburon commune in the Chardonnières Arrondissement, in the Sud department of Haiti.

See also
Bon Pas
Carrefour Gros Chaudiere
Dalmate
Galette Sèche
Perion
Plansinte  
Tiburon

References

Populated places in Sud (department)